Nanju Malige is a market on the southern side of Mysore city in Karnataka state, India.

Location
Nanju Malige Market is located in Lakshmipura area of Mysore city. Nanju Malige is located very close to Chamundipuram

Post Office
There is a post office at Nanju Malige and the PIN code is 570004.

Economy
Nanju Malige is one of the biggest market of flowers, fruits and vegetables in Mysore.  Cane goods are also popular here.  There are many banks and commercial establishments in this area.

Education
Gopalaswamy Shishuvihara group of institutions is the biggest educational organization in this area.

Image gallery

See also

 Mysore South
 Gurur
 Vidyaranyapuram
 Jayaprakash Nagar Mysore
 Ashokapuram, Mysore
 Mananthavady Road

References

Mysore South
Economy of Mysore
Suburbs of Mysore